Wassim Essanoussi (born 28 October 2003) is a Dutch professional footballer who plays as a winger for Eerste Divisie club Helmond Sport.

Career
On 3 April 2020, Essanoussi signed his first professional contract with VVV-Venlo. Essanoussi made his professional debut with VVV-Venlo as a late substitute in a record 13–0 Eredivisie loss to AFC Ajax on 24 October 2020.

Essanoussi joined Helmond Sport on 22 June 2022, signing a two-year deal with an option for an additional year.

Personal life
Born in the Netherlands, Essanoussi is of Moroccan descent.

References

External links

2003 births
Living people
Sportspeople from Helmond
Footballers from North Brabant
Dutch footballers
Dutch sportspeople of Moroccan descent
Eredivisie players
Eerste Divisie players
VVV-Venlo players
Helmond Sport players
Association football midfielders